The Aqaba Railway Corporation (ARC) is a railway company operating in southern Jordan. The railway was formed in 1979 to transport phosphate to the port in Aqaba. It uses the tracks of the Hejaz Railway partly.

History

In 1908 the Ottoman Empire built the Hejaz Railway, that ran from Damascus to Medina. After World War I and the fall of the Ottoman Empire, the railway never operated south of Ma'an. The Hedjaz Jordan Railway operated the tracks of the Hejaz railway in Jordan. In 1975 the railway built a branch from Ma'an to Aqaba, a port city on the Gulf of Aqaba. In 1979 the Aqaba Railway Corporation (ARC) was incorporated and took over the route from Abiad to Aqaba. The purpose of the ARC was to transport phosphates from mines near Abiad and Ma'an to the port in Aqaba. The ARC operated only freight trains powered by GE U17C diesel locomotives.

References

External links
 
 Aqaba Railway Corporation official site

1979 establishments in Jordan
Railway companies established in 1979
Railway companies of Jordan
Ministry of Transport (Jordan)
Aqaba
1050 mm gauge railways in Jordan
Hejaz railway